The lake Amédée is a freshwater body of the watershed of the Amédée River, in the territory of the town of Baie-Comeau, in the Manicouagan Regional County Municipality, on the Côte-Nord, in the province of Quebec, in Canada.

The area around Lake Amédée is served by a few forest roads. The eastern part of the Amédée river valley is indirectly served by the Trans-Quebec-Labrador highway (route 389).

Forestry is the main economic activity around the lake.

The surface of Lake Amédée is usually frozen from the beginning of December to the end of March; however, traffic on the ice is generally safe from mid-December to mid-March.

Geography 
Lac Amédée is located in the northwestern part of the territory of the town of Baie-Comeau. This lake in the western part of thae township of Laflèche is the main body of water on the slope of the river of the same name.

From the mouth of Lake Amédée, the current descends on  generally towards the south-east following the course of the Amédée River, in particular by crossing the urban territory of Baie-Comeau, to flow onto the north shore of the Manicouagan estuary.

Toponym 
Formerly, the hydromyne "Lac Amédée" was designated "Lac aux Perchaudes" and "Lac à l'Aigle". The acronym "lac Amédée" has appeared since at least 1933 on cartographic documents.

This acronym evokes the memory of foreman Amédée Couillard-Després, first manager of the Manicouagan sawmill. This company was founded in 1898 in Baie-Comeau by the Damase brothers and Henri Jalbert. This company specialized in cutting logs to make lumber (especially planks); these products were intended for export to Europe.

The toponym "lac Amédée" was formalized on December 5, 1968, at the Place Names Bank of the "Commission de toponymie du Québec".

See also 

 Gulf of St. Lawrence, a stream
 List of rivers of Quebec

Notes and references 

Lakes of Côte-Nord
Baie-Comeau
Manicouagan Regional County Municipality